Irene Komnene Palaiologina (–1284), after  known by her monastic name as Eulogia (Εὐλογία), was an elder sister of the Byzantine emperor Michael VIII Palaiologos. Originally close to the emperor, her opposition to the Union of the Churches in 1273 led to their estrangement, and even to intrigues by Irene against Michael involving foreign rulers. As a result, she was imprisoned for the remainder of his reign. After Michael's death, she encouraged Andronikos II Palaiologos to repudiate the Union.

Life

Irene was born around 1218, the second daughter of the megas domestikos Andronikos Palaiologos and  Theodora Angelina Palaiologina. Around 1240, she married John Kantakouzenos Komnenos Angelos, who died some time before 1257. After her husband's death, Irene became a nun and assumed the monastic name Eulogia. It is not known when exactly this happened, but she was a nun by 1261.

Irene was close with her younger brother, Michael VIII Palaiologos, on whom she exerted great influence. The historian George Pachymeres reports on how she used to lull Michael to sleep with the assurance that he would be the future emperor who would recover Constantinople from the Latin Empire; in 1261, she was the one who brought him the news of the reconquest of Constantinople. 

Pachymeres also stresses Irene's political influence, including on the matter of the legitimate emperor, the young John IV Laskaris. In order to safeguard the rights of Michael's son, Andronikos II Palaiologos, Irene urged her brother to have Laskaris sidelined completely. Laskaris was eventually blinded. She also played a role in the disgrace, and subsequent blinding, of the general John Makrenos. The marriage of her daughter Maria to the Bulgarian ruler Constantine Tikh in 1268/69 further enhanced her political position. 

However, she rejected Michael's espousal of the Union of the Churches in 1273, and became a leader of the anti-Unionist faction at court. Her relationship with her brother turned to bitter hostility, and Michael banished her to the fortress of Gregorios in the Gulf of Nicomedia. Such was the enmity between the two, that after Michael died, Irene forbade his widow Theodora to pray for him. Irene also did not hesitate to involve her son-in-law in the anti-Unionist cause: with the aid of her daughter, she incited Tikh against Michael, and even tried, without success, to form an alliance against Byzantium between Bulgaria and the Mamluk Sultanate. 

After Michael died in 1282, Andronikos II Palaiologos repudiated the Union thanks, in part, to the influence of his aunt. Irene died in early December 1284.

Family
Irene's husband John Kantakouzenos Komnenos Angelos is identified by Donald Nicol with the pinkernes John Kantakouzenos. Known children of this couple include:
 Theodora, who married (1) George Mouzalon, (2) John Raoul Petraliphas
 Maria, wife of Constantine Tikh, Tsar of Bulgaria
 Anna, wife of Nikephoros I Komnenos Doukas
 Eugenia, wife of Syrgiannes, and mother of Syrgiannes Palaiologos
 a possible fifth unnamed daughter, who married Theodore Mouzalon

References

Sources

 

 
 
 

1210s births
1284 deaths
13th-century Byzantine nuns
Irene
Byzantine prisoners and detainees
Prisoners and detainees of the Byzantine Empire